Manasamangal Kāvya is the oldest of the Mangal-Kāvya and narrates how the snake-goddess Manasa established her worship in Bengal by converting a worshipper of Shiva to her own worship. It is believed she came to Bengal with the Dravidians who worshipped her in the hope that she would protect them against snakes. Manasa is also known as Bisahari, Janguli and Padmavati.

Story

The story of Manasamangal begins with the conflict of the merchant Chandradhar or Chand Sadagar with Manasa and ends with Chandradhar becoming an ardent devotee of Manasa. Chandradhar is a worshipper of Shiva, but Manasa hopes that she can win over Chand to her worship. But, far from worshipping her, Chand refuses to even recognize her as a deity. Manasa takes revenge upon Chand by destroying seven of his ships at sea and killing his seven sons. Finally, Behula, the newly-wed wife of Chand's youngest son Lakhindar, makes the goddess bow to her love for her husband through her strength of character, limitless courage and deep devotion. Behula succeeds in bringing Chand's seven sons back to life and rescuing their ships. Then only does Behula return home. Manasamangal is basically the tale of oppressed humanity. Chandradhar and Behula have been portrayed as two strong and determined characters at a time when ordinary human beings were subjugated and humiliated. Manasa devi Maa is prayed by one community of high caste and now is prayed by all communities. Manasa's victory over Chand suggests the victory of the indigenous or non-Aryan deity over the Aryan god. However, even Manasa is defeated by Behula. The poem thus suggests not only the victory of the non-Aryan deity over the Aryan god, but also the victory of the human spirit over the powerful goddess. Manasamangal is also remarkable for its portrayal of Behula who epitomises the best in Indian womanhood, especially the Bengali woman's devotion to her husband.

Villages named due to the Kavya

Baidyapur, Hasanhati, Udaypur, etc. villages are named due to the Kavya.

Poets of Manasamangal Kavya
The earliest poet of this genre of medieval Bengali literature was probably Kana Haridatta (c. 13th century), but his work is no longer existent. His name is found in both the works of Bijay Gupta and Purushottam. Other poets who composed versions of Manasamangal after him were Purushottam, Narayan Deb (c 15th century), Bijay Gupta and Bipradas Pipilai. Bijay Gupta's Manasamangal (or Padmapuran) (1484-5) is perhaps the most popular of these versions because of its rich literary qualities. Bipradas Pipilai's Manasabijay (1495-6) was also composed during the same period. Narayan Deb's work is also known as Padmapuran.

Ketakadas Kshemananda (c.17th century), Jagajjiban Ghoshal (c.17th century) and Jibankrishna Maitra (c.18th century) were later poets of this genre.

See also
Mangal-Kāvya
Chaitanya Bhagavata
Tulsidas
Bhakti
Bengali literature
Gokul Medh claiming links to Manasamangal Kavya
Kasba claiming to be the site of Champaknagari

References

Bengali-language literature